The Church of the Holy Trinity is the oldest church in Gävle, Sweden, and was inaugurated on 14 July 1654 on the foundation of a medieval church that was burned down. 

Its location, being at a crossing of the Gävle River on the road from the south of Sweden to the north of Sweden made it an important stop on and north-south journeys.

Sörby rune stone 
The Sörby runestone is the oldest object in the church. It is a Christian rune stone from the Södertull area of Gävle that was carved by renowned carver Åsmund Kåresson in the middle of the 11th century. The runestone is dedicated to a chieftain named Egil who died on a war march to Finland.

References

Churches in Gävleborg County
Gävle